The Scottish Basketball Championship (SBC, former: Scottish National Basketball League, SNBL) is the national basketball league of Scotland. The league forms the second and third tiers of British basketball (inline with the English Basketball League) after the professional setup of the British Basketball League, where Scotland currently has one representative in the Caledonia Gladiators.

Teams

Listed below are all the teams competing in the 2022-23 Scottish Basketball Championship season.

Division 1

Division 2

Results

League

Playoffs

Former Teams
This list includes teams who no longer play in the Scottish National League and have played in 3 or more National League seasons.

BBL Competitions
Scottish National League champions Livingston were founder members of the British Basketball League when the newly-formed professional league started in 1987. The following season (1988-89), both Livingston and Glasgow Rangers finished in the top 2 of the league, with Rangers defeating Livingston 89-86 in the Playoff Final at the NEC in Birmingham. Both teams at this point were owned by David Murray. However, by the start of the 1989-90 season, neither team was based in Scotland; Livingston had folded and the Rangers franchise had returned to Kingston upon Thames.

Since 2006, several Scottish National League teams have been invited to take part in British Basketball League competitions.

For the 2006/07 BBL Trophy, the teams were split into regional groups of 4 for the first round. In that year, the North group consisted of the Newcastle Eagles, the Scottish Rocks, the City of Edinburgh Kings and the Troon Tornadoes. City of Edinburgh Kings finished 3rd in the group with a 1-2 record. Troon Tornadoes finished 4th with a 0-3 record.

Since the 2009/10 season, the BBL Trophy has been a straight knockout competition.

References

External links
 Official Basketball Scotland website
 Scottish league on Eurobasket

 
Men
Scotland
Professional sports leagues in Scotland